Suchitra Pillai (born  27 August 1970) is an Indian actress, model, anchor and VJ. A graduate in electronic engineering from the Fr. Conceicao Rodrigues College of Engineering, Bandra (West), Mumbai, she chose a career in arts over engineering. Apart from roles in movies including Dil Chahta Hai (2001), Page 3 (2005), Laaga Chunari Mein Daag (2007), and Fashion (2008), Suchitra is a singer in the Indi pop and rock genre with an album Such is Life released in 2011  She is also an accomplished theater artiste.

Personal life 
In 2005, Suchitra married Lars Kjeldsen, an engineer from Denmark, whom she met at a mutual friend's house. They have one daughter

Film career
While in school in Mumbai, Pillai was very much interested in theatre but she graduated with a B.E. in Electronics Engineering in 1991. She left for London soon after, where she became involved in a children's theatre. She started acting in movies in 1993 when she was offered her first role in a French film Le prix d'une femme as well as a role in the English film Guru in Seven.

Pillai then returned to Mumbai and was offered the job as a veejay. She first appeared in a music video by Apache Indian and then in Bally Sagoo's "Dil cheez hai kya" video. She has also forayed into television with shows like Simply South, Red Alert, Hip Hip Hurray, Beintehaa, Rishta.com and Cabaret Cabaret. Pillai appears in the 2016 Hollywood film The Other Side of the Door, and in the 2017 indie film The Valley, for which she won the Best Actress award at both The Long Island International Film Festival and The Milan International Filmmakers Festival in 2017.

Filmography

Films

Television

Web series

Singing Career 
Pillai made her debut as a singer with her first song in the album Mere Liye in 2001. Later, she sang few other songs.

Dubbing career
In 2007, she performed her first dub-over role in the Hindi version of the American movie, Live Free or Die Hard- Maggie Q's role of Mah Linh. Since then she has dubbed several other roles in Hindi; the parts of Angelina Jolie (Beowulf), Maggie Gyllenhaal (The Dark Knight), as Hela for Cate Blanchett in the Hindi version of Thor: Ragnarok, and most recently in the 2020 Netflix original October Faction as Deloris Allen.

Dubbing roles

Live action television series

Live action films

See also
 Dubbing (filmmaking)
 List of Indian dubbing artists
 List of Indian film actresses

References

External links
 
 

Living people
Actresses in Hindi cinema
Indian film actresses
Indian voice actresses
Female models from Mumbai
Actresses in Hindi television
Actresses in Malayalam cinema
Actresses from Mumbai
20th-century Indian actresses
21st-century Indian actresses
1970 births